Mohammad Reza Zarrindast is a notable Iranian pharmacologist and biomedical researcher. Zarrindast is known as an Iranian neuropsychopharmacologist around the world and he published more than 200 original research papers in peer reviewed international journals. He is currently full professor of pharmacology at Tehran Medical School.

See also 
Intellectual movements in Iran
Iranian science

References

Iranian pharmacologists
Academic staff of the University of Tehran
Living people
Year of birth missing (living people)